Luigi Ruzini (1658–1708) was a Roman Catholic prelate who served as Bishop of Bergamo (1698–1708).

Biography
Luigi Ruzini was born in Venice, Italy on 23 Apr 1658.
He was ordained a deacon on 2 Dec 1696 and as priest on 9 Dec 1696.
On 27 Jan 1698, he was appointed during the papacy of Pope Innocent XII as Bishop of Bergamo.
On 2 Feb 1698, he was consecrated bishop by Marcantonio Barbarigo, Bishop of Corneto e Montefiascone, with Francesco Pannocchieschi d'Elci, Archbishop of Pisa, and Marcello d'Aste, Titular Archbishop of Athenae, serving as co-consecrators. 
He served as Bishop of Bergamo until his death on 18 Mar 1708.

While bishop, he was the principal co-consecrator of Pietro Spínola, Bishop of Ajaccio (1698).

References

External links and additional sources

 (for Chronology of Bishops) 
 (for Chronology of Bishops) 

17th-century Roman Catholic bishops in the Republic of Venice
18th-century Roman Catholic bishops in the Republic of Venice
Bishops appointed by Pope Innocent XII
1658 births
1708 deaths
Bishops of Bergamo